Dichomera is a genus of fungi in the family Botryosphaeriaceae. There are 39 species.

Species
Dichomera camarosporioides Naumov 1927
Dichomera capparis Munjal & J.N. Kapoor 1963
Dichomera carpini Griffon & Maubl. 1909
Dichomera clethrae Dearn. 1924
Dichomera coluteae Golovin 1950
Dichomera compositarum Cooke & Harkn. 1880
Dichomera cytisi (Berl. & Bres.) Peyronel
Dichomera elaeagni P. Karst.
Dichomera firmianae Koshk. & Frolov 1973
Dichomera gemmicola A. Funk & B. Sutton 1972
Dichomera gymnosporiae S. Ahmad 1955
Dichomera heterospora M.E.A. Costa & Sousa da Câmara 1953
Dichomera inclusa M.T. Lucas & Sousa da Câmara 1953
Dichomera juglandis Ellis & Everh. 1897
Dichomera laburni Cooke & Massee 1890
Dichomera macrospora S. Ahmad 1955, N.D. Sharma 1980
Dichomera moricola S. Ahmad & Arshad 1972
Dichomera mutabilis (Berk. & Broome) Sacc. 1884
Dichomera neorhamni  B. Sutton & Dyko 1989
Dichomera oreades Cooke
Dichomera persicae Pass.
Dichomera persooniae Henn. 1903
Dichomera phaceliae Cooke & Harkn.
Dichomera prunicola Ellis & Dearn. 1905
Dichomera rhamni (Westend.) Sacc. 1884
Dichomera rhamnicola (Cooke) B. Sutton & Dyko 1989
Dichomera rhoina Cooke & Harkn.
Dichomera ribicola Grove 1937; Frolov 1968
Dichomera ripidiomorpha M.T. Lucas & Sousa da Câmara 1954
Dichomera rosarum S. Ahmad 1964
Dichomera sphaerosperma (Berk. & M.A. Curtis) Sacc.
Dichomera stromatica (Preuss) Sacc.
Dichomera tiliae (Therry) Sacc. 1884
Dichomera tragacanthae Kurbans. 1980
Dichomera trichurensis V.G. Rao & Varghese 1980
Dichomera varia Died. 1914
Dichomera versiformis Z.Q. Yuan, Wardlaw & C. Mohammed 2000
Dichomera viticola Cooke & Harkn. 1881; Maire 1913

References

External links

Dothideomycetes enigmatic taxa
Dothideomycetes genera
Taxa described in 1878
Taxa named by Mordecai Cubitt Cooke